Hesperotherium is a genus of chalicotheres from the Early to Middle Pleistocene of China. It was the last of the chalicotheres to ever exist. It belonged to the subfamily Chalicotheriinae, which also includes Anisodon, Chalicotherium and Nestoritherium.

Etymology 
The genus name, Hesperotherium, is derived from the Greek hesperos, meaning "dusk" or "west" and therion, meaning "beast". The specific name means "from China".

Palaeoecology 
Hesperotherium would have coexisted with the proboscidean Sinomastodon, the giant ape Gigantopithecus, the pig Hippopotamodon, the mouse-deer Dorcabune, and the deer Cervavitus, as well as the pandas Ailuropoda wulingshanensis and Ailuropoda baconi,  the dhole Cuon antiquus, the tapir Tapirus sinensis and the proboscidean Stegodon. Other classic animals typically include orangutans, macaques, rhinos, hedgehogs, hyenas, horses, the cow Leptobos, pikas, the extinct pigs Sus xiaozhu and S. peii, muntjac, Cervus (a deer), gaur (a cow), the goat-antelope Megalovis, and more rarely the large saber-toothed cat Megantereon.

References 

Chalicotheres
Pleistocene first appearances
Pleistocene genus extinctions
Pleistocene mammals of Asia
Fossils of China
Fossil taxa described in 2002
Prehistoric placental genera